George Glinatsis (born June 29, 1969) is a former Major League Baseball player who pitched briefly for the Seattle Mariners in . He started two games for the Mariners and finished the season 0–1. 

Glinatsis attended Boardman High School in Boardman, Ohio where he played baseball and basketball. He played college baseball for the University of Cincinnati. He was selected by the Mariners in the 32nd round of the 1991 Major League Baseball draft.

Glinatsis was assigned to the Rookie-level Arizona League to begin his professional career. He led all pitchers in the league in wins and strikeouts and had the lowest earned run average of any player with more than 50 innings pitched. In the summer of the 1994 season, the Mariners found themselves short on pitching due to injuries. On July 18, the Mariners called Glinatsis up directly from Double-A and he made his Major League debut that night as the starting pitcher against the Baltimore Orioles in Seattle. He allowed five runs in less than five innings. He made one more start six days later and allowed three runs to the Boston Red Sox in less than inning. It would be his final game in the majors. On July 27, he was replaced on the roster by Rich Amaral and returned to Double-A.

Following the 1995 season, Glinatsis was selected by the San Francisco Giants in the Rule 5 draft. Glinatsis pitched in independent baseball for the St. Paul Saints in 1997. Prior to the 1998 season, he signed with the Colorado Rockies. While pitching in the Rockies' farm system in 1998, he tied a Pacific Coast League record by hitting three batters in one inning. Prior to the 1999 season, he signed with the Arizona Diamondbacks. Ultimately, however, he would not play for the Diamondbacks organization. He finished his professional baseball career that year with the Sinon Bulls in the Chinese Professional Baseball League.

References

External links

1969 births
Living people
American expatriate baseball players in Taiwan
Arizona League Mariners players
Baseball players from Youngstown, Ohio
Cincinnati Bearcats baseball players
Colorado Springs Sky Sox players
Jacksonville Suns players
Major League Baseball pitchers
New Haven Ravens players
Port City Roosters players
Riverside Pilots players
San Bernardino Spirit players
Seattle Mariners players
Sinon Bulls players
St. Paul Saints players
Tacoma Rainiers players